Garin may refer to:

Geography
Garín, Argentina, a town in Buenos Aires, Argentina
Garin, Iran, a village in Kerman Province, Iran
Garin Rural District, an administrative subdivision of Hamadan Province, Iran
Garin, Haute-Garonne
Alternative for the Gorin (river), Khabarovsk Krai, Russia
Garin, former Armenian name given to Erzurum/Theodosiopolis (Armenia)

Names
Garin (given name)
Garin (surname)
Engineer Garin of The Garin Death Ray, 1927 novel by Tolstoy
The Hyperboloid of Engineer Garin, Soviet 1965 film based on the book
Failure of Engineer Garin, Soviet 1973 film based on the book

Others
Gar'in, a Hebrew term for groups of immigrants
Garin Tzabar, a program for children of Israelis and Diaspora Jews to facilitate their service in the Israeli military

See also
Guerin (disambiguation) (French Guérin)